The Book of Eli is a 2010 American post-apocalyptic neo-Western action film directed by the Hughes Brothers, written by Gary Whitta, and starring Denzel Washington, Gary Oldman, Mila Kunis, Ray Stevenson, and Jennifer Beals. The story revolves around Eli, a nomad in a post-apocalyptic world who seeks to deliver his copy of a mysterious book to a safe location on the West Coast of the United States. Filming began in February 2009 and took place in New Mexico.

The Book of Eli was released theatrically in the United States on January 15, 2010, by Warner Bros. Pictures. It received mixed reviews from critics, but earned $157.1 million in the worldwide box office on a budget of $80 million.

Plot
Thirty years after a nuclear holocaust, Eli travels on foot across the wasteland of the former United States. Wearing sunglasses and ragged clothes, he demonstrates uncanny survival and fighting skills. Searching for water, he arrives in a ramshackle town ruled by a warlord named Carnegie, who seeks to control the people through the power of a certain book, which his henchmen have been unable to find.

Eli barters with a store owner, the Engineer, to recharge the battery of his portable music player. At the town bar, he is attacked by a gang of bikers but swiftly kills them all. Impressed, Carnegie invites Eli to join his employ, but Eli declines. Realizing Eli is a literate man like himself, Carnegie forces him to stay the night under guard. Carnegie's blind mistress Claudia brings Eli food and water and Carnegie orders her daughter Solara to seduce Eli, but he rebuffs her. Solara sees Eli has a book, and he offers to share his food, saying grace before they eat. In the morning, Carnegie overhears Solara repeating the prayer to her mother and realizes Eli has the book he has been seeking: a Bible.

Eli sneaks away, but Carnegie and his henchmen confront him in the street. When Eli refuses to give up the book, Carnegie orders him killed; the ensuing battle leaves Eli untouched, but many henchmen dead and Carnegie shot in the leg. Solara catches up to Eli and leads him to the town's water supply, hoping to accompany him, but he traps her inside and continues alone. Solara escapes and is ambushed by two bandits who attempt to rape her, but Eli reappears and kills them. Continuing toward the West Coast, Eli explains his mission: his is the last remaining copy of the Bible since all other copies were intentionally destroyed following the nuclear war. He says that he was led to the book by a voice in his head, directing him to travel westward to a place it would be safe, and assuring that he would be protected and guided on his journey.

At an isolated house, Eli and Solara fall into a trap but manage to allay the suspicions of the residents, George and Martha, who invite them in for tea. Realizing that George and Martha are cannibals, Eli and Solara attempt to leave just as Carnegie and his men arrive. In the ensuing shootout, George, Martha, and many of Carnegie's men are killed, and Eli and Solara are captured. Threatening to kill Solara, Carnegie forces Eli to surrender the Bible before shooting him and leaving him for dead, departing with his caravan. Solara escapes, destroying one truck with a hand grenade and driving back in another to find Eli. With his remaining vehicle low on fuel, Carnegie returns to town.

Solara finds Eli, and they drive until they reach the Golden Gate Bridge. They row to Alcatraz Island, where they find a group intent on preserving what remains of literature and music. Eli tells the guards that he has a copy of the Bible. Taken inside, Eli dictates the New King James Version of the Bible from memory to Lombardi, the sanctuary's leader.

In the town, Carnegie discovers Eli's bible is in Braille, revealing Eli to be blind. Claudia, feigning ignorance of Braille, tells Carnegie that his leg wound has become infected and the loss of his enforcers has led the people to run amok. At the sanctuary, Eli has died, but not before reciting the entire book. A printing press begins producing copies of the Bible, and Lombardi places one on a bookshelf between the Tanakh and the Quran. Offered sanctuary on Alcatraz, Solara chooses instead to return home, taking up Eli's machete and other possessions.

Cast 
Denzel Washington as Eli
Gary Oldman as Bill Carnegie
Mila Kunis as Solara
Ray Stevenson as Redridge
Jennifer Beals as Claudia
Evan Jones as Martz
Joe Pingue as Hoyt
Frances de la Tour as Martha
Michael Gambon as George
Tom Waits as Engineer
Chris Browning as Hijack Leader
Malcolm McDowell as Lombardi (uncredited)

Production
In May 2007, Columbia Pictures and Warner Bros. signed the Hughes brothers to direct The Book of Eli, based on a script by Gary Whitta. (The brothers had last directed the 2001 film From Hell.) Subsequently, Anthony Peckham rewrote the script, and in September 2008 Denzel Washington won the lead role. The following October, Gary Oldman was cast to star alongside Washington. Principal photography began in February 2009 and took place in New Mexico. Alcon Entertainment financed the film and co-produced with Silver Pictures.

Jeff Imada choreographed the complex fight scenes, which feature the Filipino martial art of Kali. Washington trained for months with Dan Inosanto and Imada for his role.

Release
The Book of Eli was released in theaters in January 15, 2010, by Warner Bros. Pictures in the United States; international sales were handled by Summit Entertainment, with Sony Pictures Releasing International distributing in a large number of international territories.

The film was released on home media (DVD and Blu-ray Disc) in the United States on June 15, 2010, by Warner Bros. Home Entertainment.

Reception

Box office
The film was released in North America on January 15, 2010, in 3,111 theaters. It took in $11,672,970—$3,752 per theater, its opening day. By the end of its opening four-day holiday weekend it grossed $38,437,553—$12,355 per theater. It ranked number two, behind Avatar. On its second weekend, it placed third with Legion taking its number two place and grossed $15,732,493—$5,057 per theater. By its third weekend it dropped down to number five and made $8,908,286—$2,897 per theater. The film has come to gross $94,835,059 in the United States and Canada, and $62,256,659 in other markets, with an estimated worldwide total of $157,091,718, over an estimated budget of $80 million.

Critical reception
Review aggregator Rotten Tomatoes reports that 47% of 208 critics have given the film a positive review, with an average rating of 5.50/10. The site's consensus is that "It's certainly uneven, and many viewers will find that its reach exceeds its grasp, but The Book of Eli finds the Hughes brothers injecting some fresh stylish fun into the kind of post-apocalyptic wasteland filmgoers have seen more than enough of lately." Based on 33 critic reviews, Metacritic (another review aggregator) has assigned the film a weighted average score of 53 out of 100, indicating "mixed or average reviews".

Todd McCarthy of Variety predicted "this will not be one of ... Denzel Washington's bigger grossers." Chicago Sun-Times critic Roger Ebert gave the film three out of four stars, stating: "You won't be sorry you went. It grips your attention, and then at the end throws in several WTF! moments, which are a bonus." 

Reviewing the film for The A.V. Club, Scott Tobias graded the film a B, and wrote "At a time when theaters are experiencing a glut of doomsday scenarios, the Hughes' ashen, bombed-out future world looks a little too familiar, no matter how crisply they present it. But the showdown between Washington and a deliciously hammy Oldman complicates the film's overt religiosity...".  

Owen Gleiberman of Entertainment Weekly gave the film a D, calling it "a ponderous dystopian bummer that might be described as The Road Warrior without car chases, or The Road without humanity.

Home media
The film was released on DVD and Blu-ray Disc on May 31, 2010, in the UK and on June 15, 2010, in the United States and Canada. The DVD took the top spot on all three national home video market charts in its first week. It premiered No. 1 on Home Media Magazine's Rental Chart, the Nielsen VideoScan Blu-ray chart, and the Nielsen VideoScan First Alert Sales Chart, where it outdistanced its nearest competitor in sales by a 3 to 1 margin.

See also
 List of black films of the 2010s

References

External links

 
 
 
 
 
 

2010 films
2010 action thriller films
2010s English-language films
Alcatraz Island in fiction
Alcon Entertainment films
American action thriller films
American post-apocalyptic films
Bible in popular culture
D-Box motion-enhanced films
Films about blind people
Films about cannibalism
Films directed by the Hughes brothers
Films produced by Joel Silver
Films produced by Denzel Washington
Films scored by Atticus Ross
Films set in 2043
Films set in San Francisco
Films set in the San Francisco Bay Area
Films shot in New Mexico
Religious action films
Silver Pictures films
Summit Entertainment films
Warner Bros. films
2010s American films